Michael Heisch (born 20 May 1963) is a Swiss composer, double bass player, cultural critic and illustrator.

Life 
Heisch was born in 1963 in Schaffhausen as son of the writer and satirist Peter Heisch. From the age of seven he received piano lessons from Henri Chappat. He first completed an apprenticeship as an advertising assistant. From 1980, Heisch took private double bass lessons with Bruno Brandenberger. From 1990 to 1991 he simultaneously completed a preliminary course at the School for Design in Romanshorn.

From 1990 to 1994 Heisch studied theory with Martin Neukom and Christian Bänninger at the School of Music Theory in Zurich as well as composition with Hans Ulrich Lehmann and choral conducting and conducting with Christian Siegmann and Johannes Schöllhorn. From 1994 to 1995 he studied synthetic sound analysis with Gerald Bennett at the Zurich Conservatory. From 1998 to 2002 he then studied composition with Johannes Schöllhorn and Mathias Steinauer at the Zurich-Winterthur University of Music and Drama.

Heisch lives as a composer and cultural journalist in Zurich. As a double bass player he has already worked with the musicians , Sebastian Hofmann, Mart Lorenz and M. Vänçi Stirnemann. He is a member of the composers' collective of the Swiss Centre for Computer Music (SZCM), Member of the Board of the International Society for Contemporary Music, Zurich section and the Forum for Contemporary Music ADESSO.

Work  
 Eisenfresser  (1996). Electroacoustic music for tape
 Theuth I and Theuth II (1996). Electroacoustic music for tape
 Flaneur (1996). Electroacoustic music for tape
 5 Serifen für Streichtrio (1997) for violin, viola and cello
 5 logogrammes (1997) for flute solo
 orchestral arrangements (1997) after 4 piano pieces by Franz Liszt
 Edison (1998). Electroacoustic music for tape
 Moiré - Studies for 4 organettes (1999) for 4 organettes
 Agnus Dei (1999). Electroacoustic music for tape and organ
 Zirufim (1999). Electroacoustic music for tape and electric guitar
 Schule des Schweigens (1999/2000). A kind of mini music theatre for tape, actor and obligatory cassette recorder
 Brouillage / Bruitage (1999, rev. 2002) for double bass
 ...stumpffeine Linie von Geviertlänge...  I to V (2000). Electroacoustic music for tape, work-in-progress
 wechselspielwechsel I. Fall (2000) for organ and percussion
 Brouillage / Bruitage (2000, rev. 2003) for piano
 Night Bites (2000) for string quartet and speaker
 Vogel fliegt, Fisch schwimmt, Mensch läuft (2001). Chamber/hearing/play/piece for actors and musicians and tape recordings
 Chinese Cookies (2001) for saxophone quartet and speaker
 wechselspielwechsel II. Fälle (2001) for accordion and percussion
 6 serifs (2001) for soprano and piano
 Kitchen Accidents (2002) for percussion quartet and speaker
 Everblacks - five fake Weanalieda (2002) for voice, bassoon, piano, viola and double bass
 Brouillage / Bruitage (2002) for actor
 Best before: see lid (2002) for 2 pianoforte, celesta and harpsichord
 Night Bites - every Night (2003) for string orchestra and speaker
 zu rich (2003) for voice, violoncello, piano and turntables
 carpe noctem (2004) for bass flute, electric guitar and percussion
 kykloi (2004). Solo/voice/percussion
 Im Bauch des Türken  (2004). Piano solo
 Rondo (2005). Short opera for variable instrumentation
 anadiplosis / parekbasis (2005) for flute, violoncello and piano
 Disintegration (2005) for clarinet, accordion and double bass
 Disintegration (transcription, 2008) for saxophone, accordion and violoncello
 Arc (2008) for saxophone, violoncello and piano
 Schattenboxen (2008/09) for singer, ensemble, boxers and actors
 How would Lubitsch have done it? (2010) for flute, clarinet, violin, violoncello, piano and percussion
 Bouillage/Bruitage - Penelope (2010) for percussion
 Bouillage/Bruitage - Circe (2010) for (alto) flute
 Moiré (2011) for saxophone, piano and percussion

Discography 
 2008: Jack In The Box (DVD)
 2008: Niederländische Sprichwörter
 2010: Frozen Solid
 2010: Schattenboxen (DVD)

Further reading 
 Stefan Drees: Michael Heisch. In Komponisten der Gegenwart (KDG). Edition Text & Kritik, Munich 1996, .

References

External links 
 Website von Michael Heisch
 
 

1963 births
Living people
People from Schaffhausen
20th-century classical composers
Swiss illustrators
Swiss music critics
20th-century Swiss composers